Ulaan (red) may refer to:

 Wulan County, Qinghai, China
 Ulaan Taiga, a mountain range in north Mongolia

See also 
 Ulan (disambiguation)